Golden spike may refer to:

Entertainment
 The Golden Spike, an album by Sky Larkin
 The Golden Spike, a novel by Hal Ellson

Science
 Global Boundary Stratotype Section and Point, a term in geology
 Golden Spike Company, a former American space transport company

Sports
 Golden Spike award, an annual athletics award in Belgium
 Golden Spikes Award, an annual amateur baseball award in the United States
 Golden Spike Ostrava, an annual athletics event held in Ostrava, Czech Republic
 The Golden Spike, a tradition for both pregame and Man of The Match for soccer team Atlanta United FC in the United States

Transportation
 Golden spike, the ceremonial final spike which joined the rails of the First Transcontinental Railroad

See also
 Gold Spike (disambiguation)